Novochesnokovo is a rural locality (a selo) and the administrative center of Novochesnokovsky Selsoviet of Mikhaylovsky District, Amur Oblast, Russia. The population was 565 as of 2018. There are 20 streets.

Geography 
Novochesnokovo is located on the right bank of the Kupriyanikha River, 29 km southeast of Poyarkovo (the district's administrative centre) by road. Vysokoye is the nearest rural locality.

References 

Rural localities in Mikhaylovsky District, Amur Oblast